The Chervonokutska coal mine is an underground coal mine in the Luhansk region of Ukraine. 

An explosion in the mine on August 4, 2011, killed one worker and injured 25 others, including several who received severe burns. The explosion, at a depth of 155 m, was attributed to methane gas accumulation. Ukraine's Minister of Energy and Coal Industry, Yuriy Boyko, speculated that there had been errors in installation of a ventilation system intended to prevent methane build-up. Boyko announced that the mine's director and safety manager would be suspended while the accident was investigated.

See also 

 Coal in Ukraine
 List of mines in Ukraine

References

Coal mines in Ukraine
Coal mining disasters in Ukraine
Economy of Luhansk Oblast